Morné van Niekerk (born 17 August 1995) is a South African cyclist, who currently rides for UCI Continental team .

Major results

2013
 African Junior Road Championships
1st  Team time trial  (with Nicholas Dlamini, Jandrich Kotze & Ivan Venter)
2nd  Time trial
6th Road race
 National Junior Road Championships
2nd Road race
3rd Time trial
2015
 African Track Championships
1st  Team pursuit (with Stefan de Bod, Hendrik Kruger & Kellan Gouveris)
2nd  Individual pursuit
 1st  Time trial, National Under-23 Road Championships
 9th PMB Road Classic
2016
 National Track Championships
1st  Points race
1st  Team pursuit (with Nolan Hoffman, David Maree & Reynard Butler)
2017
 3rd Road race, National Under-23 Road Championships
 8th Overall Tour de Serbie
2019
 1st  Mountains classification, Tour du Limousin
2021
 2nd Grand Prix de la ville de Nogent-sur-Oise
2022
 7th Overall Ronde de l'Oise
 8th Tro-Bro Léon

References

External links
 

1995 births
Living people
South African male cyclists
People from Centurion, Gauteng
Cyclists at the 2014 Commonwealth Games
Commonwealth Games competitors for South Africa
White South African people